Nab or NAB may refer to:
The Nab, a fell in the English Lake District
Nab Tower, a lighthouse in England
Mazraat Nab, now the Israeli settlement and religious moshav Nov, Golan Heights
N.A.B. SC, a soccer club in Adelaide, Australia

Abbreviations
Name and address book
National Accountability Bureau, an agency of the Pakistani government responsible for investigating corruption
National Archives of Bangladesh
National Assessment Bank, an internal exam used by the Scottish Qualifications Authority
National Association of Broadcasters, the industry group representing the commercial radio stations and television stations of the United States
NAB Show, an annual trade show produced by the group
National Australia Bank, one of Australia's biggest financial institutions and one of the world's top 30 financial services companies
Needle aspiration biopsy, a medical technique
Neodymium aluminium borate
Nerf Arena Blast, a computer game
New American Bible, a Catholic English Bible translation produced by the Confraternity of Christian Doctrine
Nickel-aluminum bronze
North American Bancard

See also
McNab (disambiguation)
Banjo-Kazooie: Nuts and Bolts